The Mountain Bogs National Wildlife Refuge is a federally protected wildlife refuge located within multiple western North Carolina counties, United States.  The refuge has a total area of over  consisting of fee title and conservation easements on privately owned property.  In order to respect the wishes of the landowner, and protect sensitive habitat, the refuge is currently not open to the public.  

The refuge was established in 2015 to conserve Southern Appalachian Bogs in North Carolina and Tennessee, and the U.S. Fish and Wildlife Service plans to add more sites to the refuge, by working with willing landowners.

The reserve protects habitat for multiple threatened and endangered species, migratory birds, and important game species.

Mountain Bogs is managed by the Piedmont National Wildlife Refuge.

See also
List of largest National Wildlife Refuges

References

External links
 

Protected areas of Ashe County, North Carolina
National Wildlife Refuges in North Carolina
Protected areas established in 2015
2015 establishments in North Carolina
2015 establishments in Tennessee